Phoenix is the fifteenth studio album by Japanese singer-songwriter Maki Ohguro. It was released on 23 December 2020 under the Being Inc. label. It's her first studio album for the first time in 2 years. The album contains various collaboration tracks from various musicians, such as Ryota Mitsunaga, Rose Touma.

This album was released in two formats: regular edition and limited first press edition with DVD. The DVD disc includes 180 minute footage of the live tour "Maki Ohguro Music Muscle Tour 2019".

Promotion

Singles
This album consist of twelve previously released singles, all of them released as a digital singles.

Digital single Sharely Christmas was released on 25 December 2019 and served as an theme song to the Christmas Event "Tokyo Great Santa Run Gift".Let's Go Girls was released in March 2020. The single served as a theme song to the marathon event "Nagoya Women's Marathon 2020". Another digital single "OK was released in May 2020 and will serve as a theme song to the theatrical movie "Utsusemi no Mori".

Commercial performance
The album reached #44 in its first week and charted for 3 weeks. The album was a commercial failure, remaining as her lowest-charting and worst-selling studio album as of February, 2021.

Track listing

References

Being Inc. albums
Japanese-language albums
2020 albums
Maki Ohguro albums